Harriet Sarah Loyd-Lindsay (née Jones-Loyd), Baroness Wantage (30 June 1837 – 9 August 1920), was a British art collector and benefactor.

She was the sole heiress to the fortune of her parents Harriet Wright and Samuel Jones-Loyd, 1st Baron Overstone, who gave her Lockinge House near Wantage as a wedding present when she married Robert Loyd-Lindsay in 1858. The couple lived at 2 Carlton Gardens, London, Lockinge House, Berks, and Overstone Park and Ardington House.

She was a benefactor to many causes, most notably nursing, for which she founded the National Aid Society (later the British Red Cross Society). For this she was awarded the Order of the Red Cross in 1883. Two years later her husband was made peer of the realm and she wrote a biography of him which was published after his death. She is known for founding Wantage Hall and Abington Park.

Her large art collection at  Lockinge House, which included Turner's High Street, Oxford, Claude Lorrain's Landscape with Psyche Outside the Palace of Cupid, and other works by modern artists as well as old masters, was largely dispersed and sold after her death. Her heir A. T. Loyd sold the principal paintings at  Sotheby's, London, 28 Nov. 1945. Lockinge House was demolished in 1947, and the remainder of the collection was installed in a smaller house nearby.

Notable paintings in her collection were:

References

 Catalogue of porcelain, furniture and other works of art in the collection of Lady Wantage &c. W.H. Fairbairns, Enfield, 1912. (With Oliver Brackett)

1837 births
1920 deaths
British women writers
British art collectors
Wantage
Women art collectors
Daughters of barons